Hescamps is a commune in the Somme department in Hauts-de-France in northern France.

Geography

The Plateau Picard near the border between the departments of the Somme, the Oise and the Seine-Maritime, easily accessible via the old national road 15a (now DR 1015) and 319 (now DR 919), or by Highway A29 .

The nearest train station is in Fouilloy, at 3 km.

The common Hescamps is constituted by the four former municipalities of the Somme in 1972:

 Agnières
 Frettemolle
 Souplicourt.

The stream of Évoissons rises to Handicourt.

Population

See also
Communes of the Somme department

References

Communes of Somme (department)